A shore lead (or coastal lead) is an oceanographic term for a waterway opening between pack ice and shore. Its formation can be influenced by tidal action, or subsurface conditions, such as current and ocean floor. Commonly, a shore lead is navigable by surface vessels.

An opening ("lead") between pack ice and fast ice is referred to as a flaw lead.

References

Physical oceanography
Snow or ice weather phenomena